Brigadier Stephen Kusasira, is a Ugandan obstetrician, gynecologist, military officer and medical administrator in  the Uganda People's Defence Forces (UPDF). He serves as the Director of Medical Services in the UPDF.

Background and education
Kusasira was born in the Western Region of Uganda circa 1969. After attending Mbarara High School (1983-1986) and Ntare School (1987-1988), he was admitted to Makerere University, Uganda's oldest and largest public university, in 1989. He attended Makerere University School of Medicine, graduating in 1995, with a Bachelor of Medicine and Bachelor of Surgery degree. In 2004, he obtained a Master  of Medicine in Obstetrics and Gynecology, also from Makerere University. He is a Fellow of College of Obstetrics and Gynaecology (FCOG) of East, Central and Southern Africa. He graduated from  Uganda Management Institute 2005 with a Post Graduate Diploma in Project Planning and Management. He is a graduate of Galilee Management Institute, Israel in Health Systems Management and HIV/AIDS Management. He holds a Master of Science in Security Sector Management from Cranfield University, in the United Kingdom (2021). He is also a graduate of the Uganda Senior Command and Staff College and National Defence College- Uganda

Career
Kusasira is based at the Bombo Military Hospital, in Bombo, Luweero District. Kusasira led the UPDF efforts to staff public hospitals, when the doctors belonging to the Uganda Medical Association (UMA) went on strike in November 2017.

In February 2019, as part of a promotions exercise that involved 2,031 UPDF men and women, Kusasira was promoted from the rank of colonel to that of brigadier general.

See also
 Kenneth Ocen Obwot
 Flavia Byekwaso

References

External links
 Who is who? List of UPDF top brass and what they do As of 27 November 2014.
 UPDF gynaecologist heads ‘save life’ operation following doctors’ strike As of 20 November 2017.

Living people
1970 births
Ganda people
Ugandan generals
Ugandan obstetricians
Ugandan gynecologists
Ugandan military personnel
Makerere University alumni
People from Central Region, Uganda